Arthur Joseph Gajarsa (born March 1, 1941) is a former United States circuit judge of the United States Court of Appeals for the Federal Circuit.

Early life and education

Gajarsa was born on March 1, 1941, in Norcia, in the province of Perugia, Italy. He was the top ranked student in the 1958 graduating class at Boston Technical High School in Massachusetts. He matriculated at the Rensselaer Polytechnic Institute in Troy, New York, where he was admitted to the Zeta Psi fraternity, graduating in 1962 with a Bachelor of Science degree in electrical engineering. He then received a Master of Arts in economics from the Catholic University of America in 1964, and a Juris Doctor from Georgetown University Law Center in 1967.

Career

Prior to law school, Gajarsa served as a patent examiner with the United States Patent and Trademark Office from 1962 to 1963, and was then a patent adviser to the U.S. Air Force from 1963 to 1964, and a patent adviser to the firm of Cushman, Darby and Cushman from 1964 to 1967. He was a law clerk for Judge Joseph C. McGarraghy of the United States District Court for the District of Columbia from 1967 to 1968. He was an Attorney with Aetna Life and Casualty, Inc. from 1968 to 1969. He was a special counsel for the Commissioner of Indian Affairs, United States Department of Interior from 1969 to 1970. He was in private practice of law in Washington, D.C., from 1971 to 1997.

Federal judicial service

Gajarsa was nominated by President Bill Clinton on January 7, 1997, to a seat on the United States Court of Appeals for the Federal Circuit vacated by Judge Helen W. Nies. He was confirmed by the United States Senate on July 31, 1997, and received commission on August 1, 1997. He entered service on September 12, 1997. He assumed senior status on July 31, 2011. His service terminated on June 30, 2012, due to retirement.

Publications

He has authored Recent Developments in Antitrust for the American Bar Association in 1967-69, and The European Common Market Antitrust Laws, Catholic University, 1967. He has also published numerous articles on economics and law.

Post judicial service

On November 3, 2010, Rensselaer Polytechnic Institute announced that Gajarsa would replace Samuel F. Heffner as Chairman of the Board at the start of 2011.

In the fall of 2012, Gajarsa joined the University of New Hampshire School of Law as its first Distinguished Jurist-in-Residence at the Franklin Pierce Center for Intellectual Property. In honor of Gajarsa, UNH Law co-founded the Arthur J. Gajarsa American Inn of Court, which is the newest member of the national Linn IP Inn Alliance. The Inn was launched in Concord, New Hampshire, on September 13, 2012.

Awards and honors
Bausch and Lomb Medal, 1958
Benjamin Franklin Award, Boston Technical High School, 1958
JFK Award for Public Service, 1974
Sun and Balance Medal, Rensselaer Polytechnic Institute, 1990
Gigi Pieri Award, Camp Hale Association, Boston, MA, 1992
Rensselaer Key Alumni Award, 1992
125th Anniversary Medal, Georgetown University Law Center, 1995
Order of Commendatore, Republic of Italy, 1995
Alumni Fellow Award, Rensselaer Alumni Association, 1996
Albert Fox DeMers Medal, Rensselaer Polytechnic Institute, 1999
Paul R. Dean Award, Georgetown University Law Center, 1999
Lifetime Achievement in Jurisprudence & Italian American Leadership, Order Sons of Italy in America, 2009

Personal life
Gajarsa and his wife, Melanie have five children.

References

External links
Rensselaer Polytechnic Institute Board of Trustees
Institute of Human Virology

Georgetown Law

1941 births
Georgetown University Law Center alumni
Italian emigrants to the United States
Judges of the United States Court of Appeals for the Federal Circuit
Living people
Rensselaer Polytechnic Institute alumni
Catholic University of America alumni
United States court of appeals judges appointed by Bill Clinton
20th-century American judges
John D. O'Bryant School of Mathematics & Science alumni
21st-century American judges
American people of Italian descent